Juho Lallukka (February 3, 1852 in Räisälä, Finland – December 1, 1913 in Viipuri) was a Finnish businessman, commercial counsellor, and a patron of the arts.

Biography
Juho Lallukka was born in 1852 in the settlement of Räisälä on the Karelian isthmus, in a peasant monogynopaedium.  He lived in Vyborg until 1891. In that year he jointly found a firm with businessman Jaakko Häkli called "Häkli, Lallukka ja kumpp". In 1912 regenerate in propulsion module of "Häkli, Lallukka and To". Also was one of active functionaries of the Union of proprietors of industrial and point-of-sale enterprises of "Pamaus". In 1901-1902 he was a vice-chairman. In addition, entered in history of Vyborg as a patron of the arts, in particular, he financed city legitimate drama. One of streets of Vyborg was named after him (presently is a Mayakovsky street).

His wife, Maria Lallukka, outlived him by ten years and died in 1923. In his name in 1934 in Vyborg, a city library was built to the designs of architect Alvar Aalto.

In 1924 in Vyborg a monument was set to the married couples of Lallukka. A monument was created by a sculptor Emil Halonen. on August 30, 1986 he was opened again on the former Russian military cemetery in Lappeenranta on facilities of Union "Pamaus".

References

External links 
 http://www.eduskunta.fi/triphome/bin/hx5000.sh?{hnro}=910885&{kieli}=su&{haku}=kaikki
 http://www.lallukkasaatio.net/
 http://vyborgcity.ru/text/text_24.htm
 http://terijoki.spb.ru/trk_bs.php?item=5
 www.hs.fi

1852 births
1913 deaths
People from Priozersky District
People from Viipuri Province (Grand Duchy of Finland)
Finnish philanthropists
19th-century Finnish businesspeople
19th-century philanthropists
Finnish patrons of the arts